Dionysios Dimou is a Greek sailor. He competed at the 2012 Summer Olympics in the 49er class.

References

1985 births
Living people
Greek male sailors (sport)
Olympic sailors of Greece
Sailors at the 2012 Summer Olympics – 49er
Sailors (sport) from Athens